Caneel Bay was a resort set on a 170-acre peninsula in the Virgin Islands National Park. The resort, near picturesque beaches, is a vacation destination in the Caribbean. It is located on the northwest side of St. John, US Virgin Islands.  The resort is within Virgin Islands National Park, on property once owned by Laurance Rockefeller, and operates under a unique agreement with the US National Park Service.  The RUE (retained use estate) agreement (which Rockefeller himself drafted language for) enables the resort to operate  with a unique tax-free, rent-free status since 2004.

History 
After visiting St. John in 1952, Laurence Rockefeller was so impressed by the area's beauty that he arranged to buy up most of the island of St. John including the 573-acre Caneel Bay Plantation, and began building the first "environmetally friendly resort."  Rockefeller had the resort buildings designed to blend in with the landscape, and most property lighting is indirect to better enable guests to see the stars at night. Caneel Bay was a Rosewood Resort until the fall of 2013. The resort was a member of Leading Hotels of the World until it was devastated by a hurricane in 2017.

Rockefeller subsequently donated most of the land—approximately 60% of the island of St. John—to the U.S. government for the creation of the Virgin Islands National Park, the 29th U.S. national park.  The donation was finalized and celebrated in a ceremony on December 1, 1956. The hotel built by Rockefeller at Caneel Bay was one of the early members of Rockefeller's hotel chain, Rockresorts, and takes its name from the location of the property (Caneel means cinnamon in old Dutch).

In a letter drafted by Rockefeller in 1988, he states:

"I am concerned that the Park Service may be asked to extend the term of the Retained Use Estate, which would have the effect of enriching the seller and defeating the foundation's intent to add the Caneel property to the park as scheduled," wrote Rockefeller. "Caneel Bay is a very special site of outstanding scenic beauty which we believe should be protected and made available to the public as part of Virgin Islands National Park. We have been working together with the Park Service for over thirty years to achieve this end, but ultimately, your successors will determine whether and when the public will have the opportunity to enjoy the site as we intended."

Caneel Bay, prior to hurricane Irma in 2017, was open 10 months a year (annual closure in September & October), and provided a variety of activities such as snorkeling and scuba diving.  A diversity of marine life can be found in the area's waters.  Parrotfish, angelfish, and damselfish can be seen swimming around coral, bright sea fans or spiny sea urchins.  Viewers may also spot a barracuda, sea turtle or reef squid. The resort has not been cleaned-up or rebuilt after the hurricane's extensive damage, due to the high cost of rebuilding and an uncertain outcome of lease negotiations with the US National Park Service.  Proposals were submitted to redevelop the land and negotiate a new agreement with the US National Park service to once again operate a resort upon the land, providing much-needed jobs and other endowments to the island residents.

In December 2020, EHI Acquisitions, LLC, a subsidiary of CBI Acquisitions, and the US Department of the Interior reached an agreement to move forward with negotiations to redevelop the Caneel Bay property.

As of January 2021, petitions were organized to lobby to rebuild Canneel Bay.

Hurricane damage & rebuilding 
Caneel Bay sustained extensive damage during 2017's hurricane Irma, and has not been rebuilt however the resort's owner, CBI Acquisitions, is entertaining architectural plans to rebuild in an environmentally-friendly and more sustainable manner to "honor Laurence Rockefeller's legacy".  CBI has conditioned any re-building on the guarantee that a new lease on the property be negotiated in order to substantial the significant investment in rebuilding the resort.  CBI has operated the resort at Caneel Bay rent-free since 2004, in an agreement with the National Park Service that is set to expire on September 30, 2023.

The Caneel Purpose Group offered a proposal to rebuild the iconic hotel, donate money to the US National Park Service, and create high-wage jobs for island residents as well as offer a culinary school, additional vocational training and other collaborative-style offerings for the community at large.

Environmental contamination 
As far back as 2014, some research suggest chemical contamination from the use of pesticides and building materials at the resort.

In 2020, a Colorado-based attorney with a home on St. John, USVI filed a lawsuit against CBI Acquisitions (the firm running the resort since 2004) and the US Department of Interior (under which the National Park Service operates) -- claiming environmental contamination at Caneel Bay from the use of DDT and asbestos that may have been buried on the property.  Other environmental contaminations suspected at Canneel Bay are: arsenic, mercury, and hydrocarbons tied to fuel.

David Giacomo, the suing attorney, suggests that Caneel Bay should be a designated Word Heritage site, based on the claims of slave quarters rumored to be on the property.

Gallery

References

Further reading

External links 

 

Economy of the United States Virgin Islands
Hotels in the United States Virgin Islands
Saint John, U.S. Virgin Islands
Virgin Islands National Park